Kajymukan Munaitpasov Stadium (Qajymuqan Muńaıtpasov stadıon) is a multi-purpose stadium in Astana, Kazakhstan.  It is named after the Kazakh wrestler Kazhymukan Munaitpasov. He was the first Kazakh who became a world champion. The stadium is currently used mostly for association football matches and is the home stadium of FC Astana-64.  The stadium holds 12,350 people.

References

Football venues in Kazakhstan
Multi-purpose stadiums in Kazakhstan
Sports venues in Astana